The Canadair CL-84 "Dynavert", designated by the Canadian Forces as the CX-131, was a V/STOL turbine tiltwing monoplane designed and manufactured by Canadair between 1964 and 1972. Only four of these experimental aircraft were built with three entering flight testing. Two of the CL-84s crashed due to mechanical failures, with no fatalities occurring in either of the accidents. Despite the CL-84 being successful in the experimental and operational trials carried out between 1972 and 1974, none of the prospective customers placed any orders for the type.

Development
Between 1957 and 1963, Canadair carried out research in VTOL (vertical takeoff and landing) technology with the assistance of the National Research Board (NRB) and the Defense Research Board (DRB) of Canada. The studies pointed the way to a unique tilt-wing design. The wing and the powerplants of the aircraft could be tilted hydro-mechanically (recirculating ball actuator) so that the wing incidence changed through 100 degrees from a normal flight angle to those for STOL and VTOL. The incidence of the tailplane (or stabilizer) was automatically altered to deal with trim changes as the wing-incidence varied. The two sets of tail rotor blades were locked in a fore and aft position in conventional flight.

The design team included Canadair's chief designer, Frederick Phillips and Karlis Irbitis as well as many other designers.

At the time of the CL-84 project, Canadair was a subsidiary of General Dynamics and the parent company christened the new aircraft, the "Dynavert." Canadair project personnel typically referred to it simply as the "84".

Design

Contra-rotating rotors on a vertical axis in the tail provided fore-and-aft (pitch) control during hovering and transitional flight. The propulsion and lifting propellers were handed (i.e. revolved in opposite directions) and were interconnected by shafts through a central gearbox from which the tail rotors and accessories were also driven. The thrust from the propellers was matched automatically except when over-ridden by the pilot for lateral (roll) control in slow or hovering flight. A mechanical "mixing" unit was used to adjust the functions of the various controls in the different modes of flight. The flap/ailerons gave yaw control when hovering. In the cockpit fore and aft stick was always pitch, side to side was always roll and the rudder pedals were always yaw, irrespective of the wing position through its full range.

Two  Lycoming T53 shaft-turbines were used to drive the two  four-bladed propellers. The engines were interconnected by cross shafts, so that in the event of the failure of one engine, it would automatically  disconnect through torque spring clutches and both propellers would be driven by the remaining engine.

There were two main reasons for the technical success of the CL-84 design. Aerodynamic considerations were given a very high priority, and the controlling of power was kept as simple and direct as possible.

The propeller disks extended slightly beyond the wingtips, so the whole of the wing (except for the portion above the fuselage) was immersed in the propeller slipstream. This, together with full-span leading edge and trailing edge flaps which were programmed with wing tilt angle, ensured that the wing was never stalled. Trim changes were minimized by programmed tilting of the tailplane. All programming was based on extensive testing in the wind tunnel and on an outdoor mobile test rig.

The power of both engines was controlled by a single "power lever" in all flight regimes. To provide crisp thrust control during hover, movement of the power lever caused a direct adjustment of blade angle, analogous to the collective pitch control of a helicopter, with the propeller cpu governor making a follow-up adjustment of blade angle to maintain the selected rpm. The direct adjustment of blade angle was faded out automatically as the blade angle increased with increasing forward speed.

The only unfamiliar control function the pilot had to deal with was the wing tilt control, which was a switch on the power lever (and took the place of controlling the flaps). The combination of smooth aerodynamics and simple power control made it easy for fixed-wing pilots to perform transitions between hover and wing-down modes on their first flight in the CL-84.

Operational history

Testing

CF-VTO-X, the CL-84 prototype first flew in hover on 7 May 1965, flown by Canadair Chief Pilot Bill Longhurst. On 12 September 1967, after 305 relatively uneventful flights, CF-VTO-X was at  when a bearing in the propeller control system failed. Both pilot and observer successfully ejected but the prototype was lost. Canadair redesigned its replacement, the CL-84-1 incorporating over 150 engineering changes including the addition of dual controls, upgraded avionics, an airframe stretch ( longer) and more powerful engines (boosted by ).

The first newly designed CL-84-1 (CX8401) flew on 19 February 1970 with Bill Longhurst at the controls. He continued with the CL-84 program until his retirement from active flying in January 1971. Doug Atkins then assumed the role of chief test pilot. At about the same time, at the height of the Vietnam War, the US Navy expressed interest in the concept. The CL-84-1 performed flawlessly, demonstrating versatility in a wide range of onboard roles, including troop deployment, radar surveillance and anti-submarine warfare.

The potency of the CL-84-1 as a gun platform was dramatically illustrated in a Canadair promotional film. Fitted with a General Electric SUU 11A/A pod with a 7.62 mm minigun, Adkins maintained a rock-steady position as he sprayed a ground target. The rotating six-barrel "Gatling" gun delivered 3,000 rounds per minute.

Continuing Tripartite trials by Canadian, US (Navy/Marine) and RAF evaluation pilots at the US Navy's Patuxent River Experimental Test Center showed that the CL-84-1 was a suitable multi-mission aircraft. RAF Flight Lieutenant Ron Ledwidge became the first to make a descending transition from hovering to conventional flight and back to hovering while on instruments.

On 8 August 1973, the first CL-84-1 was lost when a catastrophic failure occurred in the left propeller gearbox in a maximum power climb. The US Navy and US Marine pilots aboard ejected safely. Canadair representatives investigated and recorded that the entire propeller and supporting structure of the gearbox had broken away during the climb. The second CL-84-1 (CX8402) was rushed stateside to complete the Phase 2 trials on board . In the face of gale storm conditions, the "84" performed tasks such as ferrying troops and "blind-flight." Phase 3 and 4 trials proceeded immediately after, but, despite positive reviews from over 40 pilots, the CL-84-1 did not win any production contracts.

Cancellation

The end of the Vietnam War meant a scaling back on military requirements, but Canadair designer Fred Phillips had been cognizant of other factors gravitating against the "84." The first and most crucial was the "NBH" (not built here) factor; Canada had overcome it with other sales to the US military but the de Havilland Canada Beaver, Otter and Caribou loomed as exceptions to the rule.

Canadair had tried unsuccessfully to sell the aircraft to other countries including Germany, Holland, Italy, Scandinavia and the United Kingdom with no orders being placed.

A prototype and three evaluation aircraft had been built. The three CL-84s that flew made a total of over 700 flights and were flown (besides Canadair test pilots) by 36 pilots from Canadian, UK and US civil and military agencies.

Aircraft on display

The two remaining CL-84s ended up in museums.  CX8402 resides in the Canada Aviation Museum in Ottawa alongside the Avro Arrow.

CX8403 was never flown and was donated to the Royal Aviation Museum of Western Canada, where it was restored and is now on display as part of the permanent collection.

Specifications (CL-84-1)

See also

References
Notes

Bibliography

 Boniface, Patrick. "Tilt-wing Testing". Aeroplane, Vol. 28, no. 3, March 2000, pp. 72–78.
 "Canada Aviation Museum CL-84 page." Canada Aviation Museum CL-84 page. Retrieved: 9 October 2006.
 "CL-84 Aircraft Operating Instructions." available on CD from http://www.flight-manuals-on-cd.com
 Phillips, F.C. "The Canadair CL-84 Experimental Aircraft - Lessons Learned". AIAA-1990-3205,  AHS, and ASEE, Aircraft Design, Systems and Operations Conference, Dayton, OH, 17–19 September 1990.
 Phillips, F.C.  "The Canadair CL-84 Tilt-Wing V/STOL Programme". The Aeronautical Journal of the Royal Aeronautical Society, Vol. 73, No. 704, August 1969.
 Phillips, Frederick C. "Lessons Learned: The Development of the Canadair CL-84 Dynavert, Experimental V/STOL Research Aircraft." CAHS Journal, Volume 30, No. 3, Fall 1992.
 Pickler, Ron and Larry Milberry. Canadair: The First 50 Years. Toronto: CANAV Books, 1995. .
 Taylor, John W.R. (editor). Jane's All The World's Aircraft 1971–72. London: Sampson Low, 1971. .
 Zuk, Bill. "Dynamic Dynavert." Canadian Aviator, Vol. 14, no. 6, November/December 2004.  Vancouver: OP Publishing Ltd. pp. 33–38.

 Kārlis Irbītis "Of Struggle and Flight". — Canada's Wings Inc., Stittsville, Ontario 1986. .

External links

 The CL-84 Dynavert: Canada’s Convertiplane
 Canada Aviation and Space museum
 Airliners.net photo 0108113
 Summary Of A Flight-Test Evaluation Of The CL-84 Tilt-Wing V/STOL Aircraft NASA TM X-1914 By Henry L. Kelley, John P. Reeder, and Robert A. Champine. Langley Research Center, March 1970 

CL-084
1960s Canadian experimental aircraft
Tiltwing aircraft
Abandoned military aircraft projects of Canada
High-wing aircraft
Turboshaft-powered aircraft
Aircraft first flown in 1965
Twin-turboprop tractor aircraft